Bade may refer to:

People
 Bade (surname)

Places
 Bade, Burkina Faso, a town in Comoé Province
 Bade, Nigeria, a Local Government Area in Yobe State
 Bade District, a district in Taoyuan, Taiwan
 Bade Emirate, a traditional state in Nigeria

Other uses
 Bade languages, a family of three languages in Nigeria
 Bade language, the language for which the group is named
 Badé, the Crow word for third-gender people such as Osh-Tisch